Community of Urbana-Champaign Cooperative Housing, or COUCH, is an association of student housing cooperatives in Urbana and Champaign, Illinois. It is a member of North American Students of Cooperation (NASCO).

COUCH began in 1997 as an umbrella organization for the independent housing co-ops in the Champaign–Urbana area, but was also founded with the vision of creating a larger co-op community to advance co-oping, establish community, and achieve economies of scale within the co-op community.  It currently consists of four houses:
Gwendolyn Brooks Cooperative (Urbana), a 14-member house, opened its doors as a member-controlled co-op house in August 2001.
Harvest House Cooperative (Urbana), another 14-member house, was also founded in 2001.
Greenhouse (Urbana), a 9-member co-op, sprang from the ashes of the five-person Phoenix cooperative (2001-2010) in 2010, which had in turn sprung from the ashes of the previous Green House cooperative (1985-2001) in 2001.
La Casa Grande Colectiva (Urbana), founded around 1970, houses seven members and is the oldest independent co-op in Champaign–Urbana.

These housing co ops provide affordable housing to students and young people. Each room is rented out separately, and each room is priced according to its size. On top of rent, each tenant pays a separate bill for utilities and food. Although rules change from house to house, it is customary that every night, one or two people cook for the house and in return, they are cooked for the other 6 nights of the week. Some houses are vegan or vegetarian, while other houses serve meat. Many commodities are included for free including free access to a washer and dryer and free printing. Many houses allow pets.

References

External links
 

Non-profit organizations based in Illinois
Residential buildings in Illinois
Student housing cooperatives in the United States
Urbana, Illinois